François De Deken (11 September 1912 – 24 January 2004) was a Belgian footballer. He played in one match for the Belgium national football team in 1936.

References

1912 births
2004 deaths
Belgian footballers
Belgium international footballers
Association football forwards
People from Schoten
Footballers from Antwerp Province